OpenFX may refer to:

 OpenFX (software) Open-source 3D modeling and animation software
 OpenFX (API) Open-source 2D image effects plugin API